The tug of war competition at the 2017 World Games in Wrocław, Poland was held on July 29 and July 30.

Medalists

References 

2017 World Games
2017
2017 in tug of war